The New York Times Magazine is an American Sunday magazine supplement included with the Sunday edition of The New York Times. It features articles longer than those typically in the newspaper and has attracted many notable contributors. The magazine is noted for its photography, especially relating to fashion and style. Its puzzles have been popular since their introduction.

History
Its first issue was published on September 6, 1896, and contained the first photographs ever printed in the newspaper. In the early decades, it was a section of the broadsheet paper and not an insert as it is today. The creation of a "serious" Sunday magazine was part of a massive overhaul of the newspaper instigated that year by its new owner, Adolph Ochs, who also banned fiction, comic strips, and gossip columns from the paper, and is generally credited with saving The New York Times from financial ruin. In 1897, the magazine published a 16-page spread of photographs documenting Queen Victoria's Diamond Jubilee, a "costly feat" that resulted in a wildly popular issue and helped boost the magazine to success.

In its early years, The New York Times Magazine began a tradition of publishing the writing of well-known contributors, from W. E. B. Du Bois and Albert Einstein to numerous sitting and future U.S. Presidents. Editor Lester Markel, an "intense and autocratic" journalist who oversaw the Sunday Times from the 1920s through the 1950s, encouraged the idea of the magazine as a forum for ideas. During his tenure, writers such as Leo Tolstoy, Thomas Mann, Gertrude Stein, and Tennessee Williams contributed pieces to the magazine. When, in 1970, The New York Times introduced its first op-ed page, the magazine shifted away from publishing as many editorial pieces.

In 1979, the magazine began publishing Pulitzer Prize–winning journalist William Safire's "On Language", a column discussing issues of English grammar, use and etymology. Safire's column steadily gained popularity and by 1990 was generating "more mail than anything else" in the magazine. The year 1999 saw the debut of "The Ethicist", an advice column written by humorist Randy Cohen that quickly became a highly contentious part of the magazine.  In 2011, Ariel Kaminer replaced Cohen as the author of the column, and in 2012 Chuck Klosterman replaced Kaminer. Klosterman left in early 2015 to be replaced by a trio of authors—Kenji Yoshino, Amy Bloom, and Jack Shafer—who used a conversational format; Shafer was replaced three months later by Kwame Anthony Appiah, who assumed sole authorship of the column in September 2015. "Consumed", Rob Walker's regular column on consumer culture, debuted in 2004. The Sunday Magazine also features a puzzle page, edited by Will Shortz, that features a crossword puzzle with a larger grid than those featured in the Times during the week, along with other types of puzzles on a rotating basis (including diagramless crossword puzzles and anacrostics).

In September 2010, as part of a greater effort to reinvigorate the magazine, Times editor Bill Keller hired former staff member and then-editor of Bloomberg Businessweek, Hugo Lindgren, as the editor of The New York Times Magazine.  As part of a series of new staff hires upon assuming his new role, Lindgren first hired then–executive editor of O, The Oprah Magazine Lauren Kern to be his deputy editor and then hired then-editor of TNR.com, The New Republic magazine's website, Greg Veis, to edit the "front of the book" section of the magazine. In December 2010, Lindgren hired Joel Lovell, formerly story editor at GQ magazine, as deputy editor.

In January 2012, humorist John Hodgman, who hosts his comedy court show podcast Judge John Hodgman, began writing a regular column "Judge John Hodgman Rules" (formerly "Ask Judge John Hodgman") for "The One-Page Magazine".

In 2014, Jake Silverstein, who had been editor-in-chief at Texas Monthly, replaced Lindgren as editor of the Sunday magazine.

Supplements

In 2004, The New York Times Magazine began publishing an entire supplement devoted to style. Titled T, the supplement is edited by Deborah Needleman and appears 14 times a year.
In 2009, it launched a Qatari Edition as a standalone magazine.

In 2006, the magazine introduced two other supplements: PLAY, a sports magazine published every other month, and KEY, a real estate magazine published twice a year.

Poetry
US Poet Laureate Natasha Trethewey selects and introduces poems weekly, including from poets Tomas Tranströmer, Carlos Pintado, and Gregory Pardlo.

Puzzles
The magazine features the Sunday version of the crossword puzzle along with other puzzles.  The puzzles have been very popular features since their introduction.  The Sunday crossword puzzle has more clues and squares and is generally more challenging than its counterparts featured on the other days of the week.  Usually, a second puzzle is included with the crossword puzzle.  The variety of the second puzzle varies each week.  These have included acrostic puzzles, diagramless crossword puzzles, and other puzzles varying from the traditional crossword puzzle.

The puzzles are edited by Will Shortz, the host of the on-air puzzle segment of NPR's Weekend Edition Sunday (introduced as "the puzzlemaster").

The Funny Pages
In the September 18, 2005, issue of the magazine, an editors' note announced the addition of The Funny Pages, a literary section of the magazine intended to "engage our readers in some ways we haven't yet tried—and to acknowledge that it takes many different types of writing to tell the story of our time". Although The Funny Pages is no longer published in the magazine, it was made up of three parts: the Strip (a multipart graphic novel that spanned weeks), the Sunday Serial (a genre fiction serial novel that also spanned weeks), and True-Life Tales (a humorous personal essay, by a different author each week).  On July 8, 2007, the magazine stopped printing True-Life Tales.

The section has been criticized for being unfunny, sometimes nonsensical, and excessively highbrow; in a 2006 poll conducted by Gawker.com asking, "Do you now find—or have you ever found—The Funny Pages funny?", 92% of 1824 voters answered "No".

Strips

Sunday serials

Of the serial novels, At Risk, Limitations, The Overlook, Gentlemen of the Road, and The Lemur have since been published in book form with added material.

References

External links
 Official website

 
1896 establishments in New York City
Fashion magazines
Fashion photography
Magazines established in 1896
News magazines published in the United States
Weekly magazines published in the United States
Magazines published in New York City
Newspaper supplements
Sunday magazines